The Premios TVyNovelas are presented annually by Televisa and the magazine TVyNovelas to honor the best Mexican television productions, including telenovelas. Instituted in 1983, the award ceremony rotates between Mexico City and Acapulco. The ceremony is broadcast through Canal de las Estrellas in Mexico and Latin America, and Univision in the United States. For the first time in its 30-year history, Canal de las Estrellas and Univision had broadcast Premios TVyNovelas simultaneously on April 28, 2013.

Ceremonies

Awards

Current awards

Discontinued awards

Honorary Awards 
In 2002, 20 Honorary Awards were bestowed to 20 performers (the best of each year), celebrating the 20th anniversary of the Award Ceremony.

Los Favoritos del Público 
In 2013, Premios TVyNovelas introduced "Los Favoritos del Público", a new mechanic that allowed telenovela fans to vote for their favorite nominees from 8 different categories using a Twitter account. The results were announced on April 27, 2013.
 Winners in 2013

 Winners in 2014

 Winners in 2015

Records and facts
Most nominations to a single telenovela

Most awards to a single telenovela

Telenovelas that won the main awards: Best Telenovela, Best Actress and Best Actor

Telenovelas which have won all nominations

Most nominated telenovelas without a win

See also
 Latin American television awards

References

External links 
TVyNovelas at esmas.com
TVyNovelas Awards at the univision.com

 
.
Mexican television awards
Mexican telenovelas
Soap opera awards
Latin American television awards
Las Estrellas original programming
Univision original programming